Classic Albums was a radio programme which ran from 1990 to 1992 on BBC Radio 1. Each episode was an hour in length. The shows were hosted initially by Roger Scott (though they were not broadcast until after his death) and later by Richard Skinner.

References

BBC Radio 1 programmes
British music radio programmes